The States Super Monoplane was a tandem two seat, civil sport and trainer aircraft built in small numbers at the start of the U.S Great Depression.

Design and development

The Super Monoplane was aimed at both training clubs and private owners. It was a parasol aircraft with rectangular plan wings supported by a long V-strut on each side from the lower fuselage and by short cabane struts centrally. Frise ailerons were fitted to retain lateral control in a stall.

It was powered by versions of the five cylinder Kinner radial engine. These were neatly cowled with only the tops of the cylinders and stub exhausts exposed. There were two open cockpits in tandem, the forward one under the centre of the wing and the other, close behind but raised, was under its trailing edge where a deep, rounded cut-out improved the field of view. Though both cockpits could have flight controls, those in the forward one were removable and the instrumentation was in the rear. A large, lockable compartment was provided for luggage.

Behind the engine the fuselage was flat-sided and tapered to a conventional tail with a triangular fin and rounded rudder. Its cockpit-adjustable tailplane was mounted on top of the fuselage and wire-braced to the fin. The elevators had a deep cut-out for rudder movement.  The Super Monoplane's landing gear was also conventional but up to date, with each hub-sprung wheel on a pair of V-struts from the lower fuselage longerons. A long oleo strut to the upper fuselage acted as a shock absorber. There was a long tailskid.

The date of the Super Monoplane's first flight is not known but it was ATC-certificated by the autumn of 1930. Most small aircraft manufacturers struggled to survive in the Great Depression and States closed in 1937, having built about six of each of its two variants.

Variants
Data from Aerofiles
B-3 1930 model with  Kinner K-5, at least six built
B-4 1932 model with  Kinner B-5, about five built.

Specifications (B-3)

References

Parasol-wing aircraft
Single-engined tractor aircraft
1930s United States civil aircraft